Mubarike "Mamba" Chisoni (born May 10, 1981 in Bulawayo) is a Zimbabwean footballer who last played for Indiana Invaders in the USL Premier Development League.

Career

College and Amateur
Chisoni left his native Zimbabwe in 2001 to attend college in the United States. He was a prolific goal scorer for Coastal Carolina University, where he tallied 27 goals and 24 assists in his three seasons with the school. Chisoni was named a Third Team All-American following his junior season. During his college years Chisoni also played with the Cocoa Expos and the Indiana Invaders in the USL Premier Development League.

Professional
Chisoni spent the 2005 season with the Los Angeles Galaxy, where he made 11 appearances, playing mostly as a left winger, using his speed and quickness to attack defenses from the flank. He also played extensively for Galaxy's reserve team in the MLS Reserve Division, finishing tied for fourth in the league with five goals in 2005.

After being released by Galaxy, Chisoni signed for the Portland Timbers in the USL First Division in 2006. He finished his season in Oregon with 2 goals and 3 assists in 17 appearances.

In 2007 Chisoni returned to his first club, Indiana Invaders, to play for their USL Premier Development League team, and as the club's marketing manager and director.

References

External links
 MLS player profile

1981 births
Living people
Zimbabwean footballers
Cocoa Expos players
LA Galaxy players
Indiana Invaders players
Portland Timbers (2001–2010) players
USL League Two players
Major League Soccer players
USL First Division players
LA Galaxy draft picks
Coastal Carolina Chanticleers men's soccer players
Zimbabwean expatriate footballers
Zimbabwean expatriate sportspeople in the United States
Association football forwards
Expatriate soccer players in the United States
Sportspeople from Bulawayo
Lindsey Wilson Blue Raiders men's soccer players
USL League Two coaches
Association football midfielders
Zimbabwean football managers